Amanda Louise Smith (born 17 July 1970) is an English former pop singer and model. She became known in the mid-1980s for her romantic relationship with, and subsequent marriage to, Rolling Stones bassist Bill Wyman, who is 33 years her senior.

Personal life
Mandy Smith lived in Tottenham as a child. She met Rolling Stones bassist Bill Wyman when she attended the BPI Awards with her older sister Nicola in 1984, while she was 13 years old. Wyman was 47, but wrote in his 1990 autobiography: "She took my breath away... she was a woman at thirteen." The relationship only became public two-and-a-half years later, when she reached the age of 16 (the legal age of consent in the United Kingdom), and resulted in a firestorm of publicity.

In 1986, Smith was to be interviewed on Irish television show Saturday Live, but cancelled when broadcaster Raidió Teilifís Éireann (RTÉ) decided she would be interviewed from a seat in the audience rather than on the set. RTÉ said she was "not important enough" and that she might "give a bad example to young teenage girls".

Smith and Wyman married on 2 June 1989 in a civil ceremony on his Suffolk estate; she was 18 and he 52. Smith had by this time developed health issues which she blamed on being on birth control pills since the age of 14, when she said her relationship with Wyman was illegally consummated; not long after the wedding, she weighed only . Wyman reportedly grew impatient with her health problems and she moved out only weeks after they wed; the marriage officially ended in divorce after 23 months. Smith won a settlement then worth a reported US$880,000. 

The story took another surprising turn in 1993, when Wyman's 30-year-old son from his first marriage, Stephen, married Smith's mother, Patsy, then aged 46. They split after a two-year marriage.

On 19 June 1993, Smith married footballer Pat Van Den Hauwe, but this marriage also lasted only two years. She published a best-selling autobiography, It's All Over Now, in 1993. In 2001, she was briefly engaged to Vanity Fair fashion model Ian Mosby with whom she had a son, Max Harrison Mosby. 

Smith later moved to Manchester to run a local public-relations company with her sister Nicola. In 2005, she returned to the Catholicism of her childhood after one of her former schoolteachers, a nun, "told me Jesus does not look at the mistakes I have made or the times I have ignored him". She stated in 2010 that she was celibate at the age of 40 and had begun working with and counselling troubled teenagers.

In 2010, Smith publicly called for the age of consent in the United Kingdom to be raised from 16 to 18, saying "People will find that odd coming from me. But I think I do know what I'm talking about here. You are still a child—even at 16. You can never get that part of your life, your childhood, back. I never could."

Music and modelling careers
While still dating Wyman, Smith signed with songwriting/producing trio Stock Aitken Waterman (SAW), after Pete Burns from Dead or Alive recommended her to pop impresario Pete Waterman. Smith was the first artist signed to Waterman's PWL Records — later the UK home of Kylie Minogue and Jason Donovan — after the producer's expectations of a £500,000 deal with a major label failed to materialise. 

Smith recorded a Hi-NRG cover of Twinkle's 1964 hit, "Terry", but the highly publicised project was scrapped at the last minute in favour of an original composition, "I Just Can't Wait". The song failed to make an impression on the UK pop charts, a result the producers blamed on the hostility of the British media, but it proved a substantial hit in a number of European counties. While the song was a commercial disappointment in her home country, the track's Balearic beat version, the "Cool and Breezy Jazz Mix", was critically well received, and has been called "one of the coolest records SAW ever made". Smash Hits Australia slated the song as "awful [and] mildly suggestive", though songwriter Mike Stock denied that the title was a reference to the scandal surrounding Smith's underage relationship with Bill Wyman.

Smith's lead vocals were augmented by PWL backing singer Suzanne Rhatigan, who says she was contracted to be a ghost singer for the project after Smith struggled with the material. An album, Mandy, was released in 1988 and spawned more hits in European countries with songs like "Positive Reaction" and "Boys and Girls". Success at home in the UK, however, continued to elude Smith.

Promotion for her final single, a cover of the Human League hit, "Don't You Want Me", was cut short just as the track rose to be her highest-charting UK single, after Smith became seriously ill. Referring to the lingering trauma of Smith's underage sex scandal and the intense tabloid scrutiny that followed the young star, former PWL Records engineer Karen Hewitt noted of her escalating health crisis, "She got really sick and couldn't continue; she just couldn't physically work".

Smith also worked as a print and runway model for fashion designers including Katharine Hamnett.

Discography

Studio albums

Singles/EPs

References

External links

Living people
Place of birth missing (living people)
The Rolling Stones
1970 births
English women pop singers
English Roman Catholics